Torbjörn Harrysson (1943-2010) was a speedway rider from Sweden.

Speedway career 
Harrysson was a leading speedway rider in the 1960s. He reached the final of the Speedway World Championship on three occasions; in the 1966 Individual Speedway World Championship, 1968 Individual Speedway World Championship and the 1969 Individual Speedway World Championship.

He won the silver medal in 1968 and bronze medal in 1967 at the Swedish Championship. 

Harrysson helped Sweden win the World Team Cup in 1967 as well as the Speedway World Pairs Championship in 1968.

He rode in the top tier of British Speedway from 1967 until 1968, riding for Newport Wasps.

World Final Appearances

Individual World Championship
 1966 -  Gothenburg, Ullevi - 5th - 10pts
 1968 –  Gothenburg, Ullevi – 6th – 10pts
 1969 -  London, Wembley Stadium - 14th - 4pts

World Pairs Championship
 1968* -  Kempten (with Ove Fundin) - Winner - 24pts (10)
* Unofficial World Championships.

World Team Cup
 1967 -  Malmö, Malmö Stadion (with Ove Fundin / Göte Nordin / Bengt Jansson) - Winner - 32pts (6)
 1968 -  London, Wembley Stadium (with Ove Fundin / Anders Michanek / Olle Nygren / Bengt Jansson) - 2nd - 30pts (2)

References 

1943 births
2010 deaths
Swedish speedway riders
Newport Wasps riders
Sportspeople from Gotland County